Charles Elmer Allen (October 4, 1872 in Horicon, Wisconsin – June 25, 1954) was an American botanist and cell biologist whose discoveries include the first documentation of sex chromosomes in plants. He was a member of the United States National Academy of Sciences, and held presidencies of the Botanical Society of America (1921), the Wisconsin Academy of Sciences, Arts and Letters (1931-1933), the American Society of Naturalists (1936), and the American Microscopical Society (1948). Allen was a professor at the University of Wisconsin for over 20 years.

References

1872 births
1954 deaths
American botanists
Cell biologists
Bryologists
Members of the United States National Academy of Sciences
University of Wisconsin–Madison faculty
People from Horicon, Wisconsin
Members of the American Philosophical Society